Mikhalevo or Mikhalyovo is the name of several rural localities in Russia.

Modern localities

Arkhangelsk Oblast
As of 2012, four rural localities in Arkhangelsk Oblast bear this name:
Mikhalevo, Kargopolsky District, Arkhangelsk Oblast, a village in Khotenovsky Selsoviet of Kargopolsky District
Mikhalevo, Kotlassky District, Arkhangelsk Oblast, a village in Solvychegodsky Selsoviet of Kotlassky District
Mikhalevo, Plesetsky District, Arkhangelsk Oblast, a village in Fedovsky Selsoviet of Plesetsky District
Mikhalevo, Ustyansky District, Arkhangelsk Oblast, a village in Likhachevsky Selsoviet of Ustyansky District

Ivanovo Oblast
As of 2012, five rural localities in Ivanovo Oblast bear this name:
Mikhalevo, Ivanovsky District, Ivanovo Oblast, a selo in Ivanovsky District
Mikhalevo, Privolzhsky District, Ivanovo Oblast, a village in Privolzhsky District
Mikhalevo, Savinsky District, Ivanovo Oblast, a selo in Savinsky District
Mikhalevo (Semeykinskoye Rural Settlement), Shuysky District, Ivanovo Oblast, a village in Shuysky District; municipally, a part of Semeykinskoye Rural Settlement of that district
Mikhalevo (Vasilyevskoye Rural Settlement), Shuysky District, Ivanovo Oblast, a village in Shuysky District; municipally, a part of Vasilyevskoye Rural Settlement of that district

Kaluga Oblast
As of 2012, two rural localities in Kaluga Oblast bear this name:
Mikhalevo, Kirovsky District, Kaluga Oblast, a village in Kirovsky District
Mikhalevo, Maloyaroslavetsky District, Kaluga Oblast, a village in Maloyaroslavetsky District

Kostroma Oblast
As of 2012, five rural localities in Kostroma Oblast bear this name:
Mikhalevo, Orekhovskoye Settlement, Galichsky District, Kostroma Oblast, a village in Orekhovskoye Settlement of Galichsky District
Mikhalevo, Orekhovskoye Settlement, Galichsky District, Kostroma Oblast, a village in Orekhovskoye Settlement of Galichsky District
Mikhalevo, Mezhevskoy District, Kostroma Oblast, a village in Georgiyevskoye Settlement of Mezhevskoy District; 
Mikhalevo, Neysky District, Kostroma Oblast, a village in Vozherovskoye Settlement of Neysky District; 
Mikhalevo, Nikolo-Polomskoye Settlement, Parfenyevsky District, Kostroma Oblast, a village in Nikolo-Polomskoye Settlement of Parfenyevsky District;

Kurgan Oblast
As of 2012, one rural locality in Kurgan Oblast bears this name:
Mikhalevo, Kurgan Oblast, a selo in Lugovskoy Selsoviet of Tselinny District;

Leningrad Oblast
As of 2012, three rural localities in Leningrad Oblast bear this name:
Mikhalevo, Boksitogorsky District, Leningrad Oblast, a village under the administrative jurisdiction of Yefimovskoye Settlement Municipal Formation in Boksitogorsky District; 
Mikhalyovo, Tikhvinsky District, Leningrad Oblast (or Mikhalevo), a village in Gankovskoye Settlement Municipal Formation of Tikhvinsky District; 
Mikhalevo, Vyborgsky District, Leningrad Oblast, a settlement under the administrative jurisdiction of Kamennogorskoye Settlement Municipal Formation in Vyborgsky District;

Moscow Oblast
As of 2012, nine rural localities in Moscow Oblast bear this name:
Mikhalevo, Dmitrovsky District, Moscow Oblast, a village in Bolsherogachevskoye Rural Settlement of Dmitrovsky District
Mikhalevo, Lotoshinsky District, Moscow Oblast, a village under the administrative jurisdiction of Lotoshino Work Settlement in Lotoshinsky District
Mikhalevo, Mozhaysky District, Moscow Oblast, a village in Drovninskoye Rural Settlement of Mozhaysky District
Mikhalevo, Pavlovo-Posadsky District, Moscow Oblast, a village in Kuznetsovskoye Rural Settlement of Pavlovo-Posadsky District
Mikhalevo, Pushkinsky District, Moscow Oblast, a village in Yeldiginskoye Rural Settlement of Pushkinsky District
Mikhalevo, Sergiyevo-Posadsky District, Moscow Oblast, a village in Shemetovskoye Rural Settlement of Sergiyevo-Posadsky District
Mikhalevo, Shakhovskoy District, Moscow Oblast, a village in Seredinskoye Rural Settlement of Shakhovskoy District
Mikhalevo, Voskresensky District, Moscow Oblast, a selo under the administrative jurisdiction of Beloozersky Work Settlement in Voskresensky District
Mikhalevo, Zaraysky District, Moscow Oblast, a village in Strupnenskoye Rural Settlement of Zaraysky District

Nizhny Novgorod Oblast
As of 2012, two rural localities in Nizhny Novgorod Oblast bear this name:
Mikhalevo, Chkalovsky District, Nizhny Novgorod Oblast, a village in Kotelnitsky Selsoviet of Chkalovsky District
Mikhalevo, Vachsky District, Nizhny Novgorod Oblast, a village in Kazakovsky Selsoviet of Vachsky District

Novgorod Oblast
As of 2012, three rural localities in Novgorod Oblast bear this name:
Mikhalevo, Borovichsky District, Novgorod Oblast, a village in Yegolskoye Settlement of Borovichsky District
Mikhalevo, Demyansky District, Novgorod Oblast, a village in Zhirkovskoye Settlement of Demyansky District
Mikhalevo, Lyubytinsky District, Novgorod Oblast, a village under the administrative jurisdiction of the Settlement of Lyubytinskoye in Lyubytinsky District

Oryol Oblast
As of 2012, one rural locality in Oryol Oblast bears this name:
Mikhalevo, Oryol Oblast, a village in Petushensky Selsoviet of Novosilsky District

Pskov Oblast
As of 2012, five rural localities in Pskov Oblast bear this name:
Mikhalevo, Dedovichsky District, Pskov Oblast, a village in Dedovichsky District
Mikhalevo, Ostrovsky District, Pskov Oblast, a village in Ostrovsky District
Mikhalevo, Palkinsky District, Pskov Oblast, a village in Palkinsky District
Mikhalevo, Pechorsky District, Pskov Oblast, a village in Pechorsky District
Mikhalevo, Pskovsky District, Pskov Oblast, a village in Pskovsky District

Smolensk Oblast
As of 2012, one rural locality in Smolensk Oblast bears this name:
Mikhalevo, Smolensk Oblast, a village in Zhichitskoye Rural Settlement of Demidovsky District

Tver Oblast
As of 2012, eleven rural localities in Tver Oblast bear this name:
Mikhalevo, Belsky District, Tver Oblast, a village in Demyakhovskoye Rural Settlement of Belsky District
Mikhalevo, Bezhetsky District, Tver Oblast, a village in Sukromenskoye Rural Settlement of Bezhetsky District
Mikhalevo, Kimrsky District, Tver Oblast, a village in Goritskoye Rural Settlement of Kimrsky District
Mikhalevo, Krasnokholmsky District, Tver Oblast, a village in Likhachevskoye Rural Settlement of Krasnokholmsky District
Mikhalevo, Nelidovsky District, Tver Oblast, a village in Zemtsovskoye Rural Settlement of Nelidovsky District
Mikhalevo, Rzhevsky District, Tver Oblast, a village in Itomlya Rural Settlement of Rzhevsky District
Mikhalevo, Selizharovsky District, Tver Oblast, a village in Dmitrovskoye Rural Settlement of Selizharovsky District
Mikhalevo, Udomelsky District, Tver Oblast, a village in Moldinskoye Rural Settlement of Udomelsky District
Mikhalevo, Vesyegonsky District, Tver Oblast, a village in Ivanovskoye Rural Settlement of Vesyegonsky District
Mikhalevo, Zapadnodvinsky District, Tver Oblast, a village in Sharapovskoye Rural Settlement of Zapadnodvinsky District
Mikhalevo, Zharkovsky District, Tver Oblast, a village in Novoselkovskoye Rural Settlement of Zharkovsky District

Vladimir Oblast
As of 2012, three rural localities in Vladimir Oblast bear this name:
Mikhalevo, Muromsky District, Vladimir Oblast, a village in Muromsky District
Mikhalevo (Lavrovskoye Rural Settlement), Sudogodsky District, Vladimir Oblast, a village in Sudogodsky District; municipally, a part of Lavrovskoye Rural Settlement of that district
Mikhalevo (Golovinskoye Rural Settlement), Sudogodsky District, Vladimir Oblast, a village in Sudogodsky District; municipally, a part of Golovinskoye Rural Settlement of that district

Vologda Oblast
As of 2012, seventeen rural localities in Vologda Oblast bear this name:
Mikhalevo, Belozersky District, Vologda Oblast, a village in Paninsky Selsoviet of Belozersky District
Mikhalevo, Ilyinsky Selsoviet, Cherepovetsky District, Vologda Oblast, a village in Ilyinsky Selsoviet of Cherepovetsky District
Mikhalevo, Myaksinsky Selsoviet, Cherepovetsky District, Vologda Oblast, a village in Myaksinsky Selsoviet of Cherepovetsky District
Mikhalevo, Gryazovetsky District, Vologda Oblast, a village in Pertsevsky Selsoviet of Gryazovetsky District
Mikhalevo, Kaduysky District, Vologda Oblast, a village in Velikoselsky Selsoviet of Kaduysky District
Mikhalevo, Kharovsky District, Vologda Oblast, a village in Kubinsky Selsoviet of Kharovsky District
Mikhalevo, Kirillovsky District, Vologda Oblast, a village in Nikolo-Torzhsky Selsoviet of Kirillovsky District
Mikhalevo, Mezhdurechensky District, Vologda Oblast, a village in Vragovsky Selsoviet of Mezhdurechensky District
Mikhalevo, Nesterovsky Selsoviet, Sokolsky District, Vologda Oblast, a village in Nesterovsky Selsoviet of Sokolsky District
Mikhalevo, Pelshemsky Selsoviet, Sokolsky District, Vologda Oblast, a village in Pelshemsky Selsoviet of Sokolsky District
Mikhalevo, Vorobyevsky Selsoviet, Sokolsky District, Vologda Oblast, a village in Vorobyevsky Selsoviet of Sokolsky District
Mikhalevo, Ustyuzhensky District, Vologda Oblast, a village in Mezzhensky Selsoviet of Ustyuzhensky District
Mikhalevo, Chushevitsky Selsoviet, Verkhovazhsky District, Vologda Oblast, a village in Chushevitsky Selsoviet of Verkhovazhsky District
Mikhalevo, Shelotsky Selsoviet, Verkhovazhsky District, Vologda Oblast, a village in Shelotsky Selsoviet of Verkhovazhsky District
Mikhalevo, Bereznikovsky Selsoviet, Vologodsky District, Vologda Oblast, a village in Bereznikovsky Selsoviet of Vologodsky District
Mikhalevo, Podlesny Selsoviet, Vologodsky District, Vologda Oblast, a village in Podlesny Selsoviet of Vologodsky District
Mikhalevo, Vytegorsky District, Vologda Oblast, a village in Andomsky Selsoviet of Vytegorsky District

Yaroslavl Oblast
As of 2012, sixteen rural localities in Yaroslavl Oblast bear this name:
Mikhalevo, Breytovsky District, Yaroslavl Oblast, a village in Ulyanovsky Rural Okrug of Breytovsky District
Mikhalevo, Dmitriyevsky Rural Okrug, Danilovsky District, Yaroslavl Oblast, a village in Dmitriyevsky Rural Okrug of Danilovsky District
Mikhalevo, Fedurinsky Rural Okrug, Danilovsky District, Yaroslavl Oblast, a village in Fedurinsky Rural Okrug of Danilovsky District
Mikhalevo, Vakhtinsky Rural Okrug, Danilovsky District, Yaroslavl Oblast, a village in Vakhtinsky Rural Okrug of Danilovsky District
Mikhalevo, Gavrilov-Yamsky District, Yaroslavl Oblast, a village in Zayachye-Kholmsky Rural Okrug of Gavrilov-Yamsky District
Mikhalevo, Lyubimsky District, Yaroslavl Oblast, a village in Voskresensky Rural Okrug of Lyubimsky District
Mikhalevo, Borovskoy Rural Okrug, Nekrasovsky District, Yaroslavl Oblast, a village in Borovskoy Rural Okrug of Nekrasovsky District
Mikhalevo, Klimovsky Rural Okrug, Nekrasovsky District, Yaroslavl Oblast, a village in Klimovsky Rural Okrug of Nekrasovsky District
Mikhalevo, Pereslavsky District, Yaroslavl Oblast, a selo in Aleksinsky Rural Okrug of Pereslavsky District
Mikhalevo, Pervomaysky District, Yaroslavl Oblast, a village in Prechistensky Rural Okrug of Pervomaysky District
Mikhalevo, Mikhaylovsky Rural Okrug, Rybinsky District, Yaroslavl Oblast, a village in Mikhaylovsky Rural Okrug of Rybinsky District
Mikhalevo, Mikhaylovsky Rural Okrug, Rybinsky District, Yaroslavl Oblast, a village in Mikhaylovsky Rural Okrug of Rybinsky District
Mikhalevo, Pokrovsky Rural Okrug, Rybinsky District, Yaroslavl Oblast, a village in Pokrovsky Rural Okrug of Rybinsky District
Mikhalevo, Chebakovsky Rural Okrug, Tutayevsky District, Yaroslavl Oblast, a village in Chebakovsky Rural Okrug of Tutayevsky District
Mikhalevo, Pomogalovsky Rural Okrug, Tutayevsky District, Yaroslavl Oblast, a village in Pomogalovsky Rural Okrug of Tutayevsky District
Mikhalevo, Uglichsky District, Yaroslavl Oblast, a village in Pokrovsky Rural Okrug of Uglichsky District

Abolished localities
Mikhalevo, Anosovsky Selsoviet, Parfenyevsky District, Kostroma Oblast, a village in Anosovsky Selsoviet of Parfenyevsky District in Kostroma Oblast; abolished on October 18, 2004

References

Notes

Sources